The 1907 Baylor football team was an American football team that represented Baylor University as an independent during the 1907 college football season. In its first season under head coach Luther Burleson, the team compiled a 4–3–1 record and was outscored by a total of 105 to 91.

Baylor's December 6 game at LSU was the team's first ever east of the Mississippi.

Schedule

Background

Baylor University did not field a team in 1906.  Due to the violence of football, the sport was banned by the Board of Trustees in May 1906.

Under student pressure and a lack of interest in the school's athletics team, the trustees lifted the ban the following year.

References

Baylor
Baylor Bears football seasons
Baylor